Andhra Mahasabha (Telugu: ఆంధ్ర మహాసభ, IAST: Āndhra mahāsabha) was a people's organisation in the erstwhile Hyderabad state of India. The organization spearheaded people's awareness and people's movements among the Telugu-speaking populace of the state and eventually joined hands with the Communist Party of India to launch the Telangana rebellion.

History 
An organization was originally started under the name Andhra Janasangham in November 1921. It started with a mere 12 members after a failed attempt to pass a resolution in Telugu at Nizam's Social Reforms Conference in Hyderabad. Membership quickly increased to about a hundred and its first conference was held in February 1922 under the chairmanship of Konda Venkata Ranga Reddy with Madapati Hanumantha Rao as its secretary.

It was in 1928 when Madapati Hanumantha Rao took the lead to form Andhra Maha Sabha. First conference was held in 1930 at Jogipet under the chairmanship of Suravaram Pratapareddy.

References

Further reading 
 

Peasant revolts
History of Andhra Pradesh
Organizations established in 1921
Communist Party of India